Jock Jams, Volume 2 is the second album in the Jock Jams compilation album series, released in August 1996.

Track listing
"Welcome to the Big Show" - Dan Patrick and Chris Berman
"No Limit" - 2 Unlimited
"Everybody Everybody" - Black Box
"1, 2, 3, 4 (Sumpin' New)" - Coolio
"We Got a Love Thang" - CeCe Peniston
"This Is Your Night" - Amber
"Hey, Hey You" - The Jock Jams Cheerleaders
"This Is How We Do It" - Montell Jordan
"Set It Off" - Strafe
"Macarena" - Los del Mar
"I Like to Move It" - Reel 2 Real
"Groovin' in the Bleachers" - The Jock Jams Cheerleaders	
"Party" - Dis N' Dat
"Get Down Tonight" - KC and the Sunshine Band
"Give It Up" - The Goodmen
"Action, Boys, Action" - The Jock Jams Cheerleaders
"The Bomb" - The Bucketheads
"Boom Boom Boom" - The Outhere Brothers
"What's Up" - DJ Miko
"Happy and You Know It" - Ray Castoldi
"Macho Man" - Village People

Charts

References

Dance music compilation albums
Jock series
1996 compilation albums
Tommy Boy Records compilation albums